Opus Visionário is the ninth solo album by Brazilian musician Zé Ramalho. It was released in 1986. Geraldo Azevedo, a famous Brazilian MPB singer, made a guest appearance in the track "Pedras e moças".

Track listing

Personnel 
 Zé Ramalho - Lead vocals, acoustic guitar
 Geraldo Azevedo - Acoustic guitar
 Joca - Acoustic guitar and guitar solo on track 6
 Mauro Motta - Choir Emulator and Bells on track 6 Programming
 Lincoln Olivetti - Bass emulator & sound effects on track 6, Programming
 Robson Jorge - Programming
 Ariovaldo - Tumbadora on tracks 1, 7, triangle on tracks 1, 7, cincerro on track 1, 9, Xique-Xique on track 7, Maraca on track 7, Kiko on track 7
 Fernandinho - Bass guitar
 Neguinho - Drums
 Mingo Araújo - Conga, gong, Russian spoon, Berra-boi
 Claudia Olivetti - Choir
 Cláudia Telles - Choir
 Myriam Peracchi - Choir
 Rosana - Choir
 Sônia Bonfá - Choir

References

1986 albums
Zé Ramalho albums
Epic Records albums